Merveille Mbemba Makiesse, known as Merveille Mbemba, is a DR Congolese footballer who plays as a midfielder for CSF Bikira and the DR Congo women's national team.

Club career
Mbemba has played for Promesse Star and CSF Bikira in the Democratic Republic of the Congo.

International career
Mbemba capped for the DR Congo at senior level during the 2020 UNNIFAC Women's Cup.

See also
 List of Democratic Republic of the Congo women's international footballers

References

External links

Year of birth missing (living people)
Living people
Footballers from Kinshasa
Democratic Republic of the Congo women's footballers
Women's association football midfielders
Democratic Republic of the Congo women's international footballers